Insulin gene enhancer protein ISL-1 is a protein that in humans is encoded by the ISL1 gene.

Function 

This gene encodes a transcription factor containing two N-terminal LIM domains and one C-terminal homeodomain. The encoded protein plays an important role in the embryogenesis of pancreatic islets of Langerhans. In mouse embryos, a deficiency of this gene results in failure to undergo neural tube motor neuron differentiation.

Interactions 

ISL1 has been shown to interact with Estrogen receptor alpha.

Role in cardiac development 

ISL1 is a marker for cardiac progenitors of the secondary heart field (SHF) which includes the right ventricle and the outflow tract. The biological function of ISL1 is demonstrated through ISL1 mutant mice and chick embryos that have altered cell proliferation, survival, and migration of cardiogenic precursors and severe cardiac defects. More recently it has been defined as a marker for a cardiac progenitor cell lineage that is capable of differentiating into all 3 major cell types of the heart: cardiomyocytes, smooth muscle and endothelial cell lineages. Research has shown that ISL1 promotes differentiation of cardiac cells and a depletion of ISL1 can respecify the cell fate of nascent cardiomyocytes, such as from ventricular to an atrial identity. 

The validity of ISL1 as a marker for cardiac progenitor cells has been questioned since some groups have found no evidence that ISL1 cells serve as cardiac progenitors. Furthermore, ISL1 is not restricted to second heart field progenitors in the developing heart, but also labels cardiac neural crest. This paper supports work from the Vilquin group in 2011, which concluded that ISL1 can represent cells from both neural crest and cardiomyocyte lineages. While it has been demonstrated by multiple groups that ISL1-positive cells can indeed differentiate into all 3 major cell types of the heart, their significance in cardiovascular development is still unclear and their clinical relevance has been seriously questioned.

References

Further reading

External links 
 

Transcription factors